PLATINUM BOX I is a VHS tape released by Japanese singer Gackt on December 16, 2000.
Included with the VHS tape is an audio recording of the MARS 空からの訪問者〜回想〜 Concert performed by Gackt in 2000.

VHS Content 
 鶺鴒～seki-ray～ [SEKI RAY ~seki-ray~]
 鶺鴒～seki-ray～ [SEKI RAY ~seki-ray~]  (making of)
 再会〜Story〜 [Saikai 〜Story〜]
 再会〜Story〜 [Saikai 〜Story〜] (making of)
 Christmas message from Gackt

Track listing CD
 "Ares"  – 1:54 
 "Asrun Dream"  – 5:58
 "絵夢〜for my dear〜" [Emu–for my dear–] 6:12
 "Illness Illusion"  – 3:27
 "鶺鴒～seki-ray～" [Sekirei-seki-ray-]  – 4:55
 "freesia〜op.1〜"  – 4:10
 "freesia〜op.2〜"  – 2:31
 "Blue"  – 4:45
 "OASIS"  – 4:52
 "Mirror"  – 8:03
 "U+K"  – 5:30
 "Vanilla"  – 4:15
 "dears"  – 5:27
 "この誰もいない部屋で" [Kono daremo inai heya de]  – 16:50

References

Notes
 Studio recordings of most of these songs can be found on Gackt's first album, MARS.

2000 video albums
Gackt video albums
Music video compilation albums
2000 compilation albums